Ahmed Khairi Sa'id was an Egyptian literary figure, theoretician of Al-Madrasa al-Ḥadītha, and editor of its publication: al-Fajar.

Muhammad Amin Hassuna described him as a Bohemian and Epicurean. He originated the concept of "al-Hadam wal-Bina'" ( "destruction and construction") and called for literary renewal. He also coined the slogan of Al-Madrasa al-Ḥadītha: "Long live authenticity, long live innovation. Long live renewal and reform.".

He is considered a father of the modern Arabic short story, along with Mahmud Taymur, Yahya Haqqi, and others.

Muhammad Amin Hassuna profiled him in his column on Modern Arabic literature in Al-Hadith.

References 

Egyptian male writers
Egyptian literary critics
Literary modernism